Yaylapınar is a village in the Şemdinli District in Hakkâri Province in Turkey. The village is populated by Kurds of the Herkî tribe and had a population of 931 in 2022.

Yaylapınar has the five hamlets of Yukarıyaylapınar, İspindare, Bezelan, Duyi and Deruki attached to it.

Population 
Population history of the village from 2000 to 2022:

References 

Villages in Şemdinli District
Kurdish settlements in Hakkâri Province